The 2013 Thai Premier League (also known as Toyota Thai Premier League due to the sponsorship from Toyota) is the 17th season of the Thai Premier League since its establishment in 1996. A total of 18 teams are competing in the league. It will begin in 2 March 2013 to 3 November 2013.

Muangthong United are the defending champions, having won their Thai Premier League title the previous season. they win the Thai Premier League is a third of the club and Muangthong United became the first team in Thai Premier League to go the season unbeaten in the current 34-game format.

Teams
A total of 18 teams will contest the league, including 15 sides from the 2012 season and three promoted from the 2012 Thai Division 1 League.

TTM Chiangmai, BBCU and Singhtarua were relegated to the 2013 Thai Division 1 League after finishing the 2012 season in the bottom three places. They were replaced by the best three teams from the 2012 Thai Division 1 League champions Ratchaburi, runners-up Suphanburi and third place Bangkok United.

Esan United were originally replaced by Sisaket, but it was discovered the move from Sisaket to Uban Ratchathani (and as a consequence thereof naming the club Esan United) was facilitated with forged documents, fraud and other criminal activity. Sisaket, after a hasty change of ownership, went into recess for this season.

Stadiums and locations
Note: Table lists in alphabetical order.

Personnel and sponsoring
Note: Flags indicate national team as has been defined under FIFA eligibility rules. Players may hold more than one non-FIFA nationality.

Managerial changes

Foreign players
The number of foreign players is restricted to seven per TPL team, but only five of them can be on the game sheet in each game. A team can use four foreign players on the field in each game, including at least one player from the AFC country.

League table

Results

Season statistics

Top scorers
.

Hat-tricks

 4 Player scored 4 goals

Awards

Monthly awards

Annual awards

Player of the Year

Coach of the Year

Golden Boot

Fair Play

Attendances

See also
 2013 League One
2013 Regional League Division 2
 2013 AFC Champions League
 2013 Thai FA Cup
 2013 Thai League Cup
 Thai Premier League All-Star Football

References

2013
1